Ruidoso Lookout Tower was completed in 1940 by the U.S. Forest Service to serve as a fire lookout tower within Lincoln National Forest, New Mexico, United States.  It remains in active use for detection of urban/suburban fires in the town of Ruidoso, which has grown over the years to surround the tower.  The structure is a 30’ Aermotor tower with metal catwalks and is topped with a 14’x14’ wooden cab.

The structure is listed on the National Register of Historic Places, as well as the New Mexico State Register of Cultural Properties.

The first detonation of a nuclear device by the Manhattan Project at Trinity Site was observed by Herbert Lee Traylor, the forest ranger on duty at the Ruidoso Lookout tower at the time of the explosion.

See also 

National Register of Historic Places listings in Lincoln County, New Mexico

References 

Government buildings completed in 1940
Towers completed in 1940
Government buildings on the National Register of Historic Places in New Mexico
Buildings and structures in Lincoln County, New Mexico
Fire lookout towers on the National Register of Historic Places in New Mexico
National Register of Historic Places in Lincoln County, New Mexico